Guillaume Heinry (born 3 December 1989) is a French professional footballer who plays as a midfielder for Championnat National 2 club Saint-Malo.

References

1989 births
Living people
Association football midfielders
French footballers
Championnat National 2 players
Championnat National players
Ligue 2 players
Championnat National 3 players
Stade Rennais F.C. players
La Vitréenne FC players
AFC Compiègne players
AS Beauvais Oise players
Football Bourg-en-Bresse Péronnas 01 players
FC Chambly Oise players
US Saint-Malo players